David L. Wagner (born 1956) is an entomologist and a professor of ecology and evolutionary biology at the University of Connecticut. He is the author of Caterpillars of Eastern North America, widely regarded as one of the most authoritative field guides on caterpillars. He also serves as an advisor for the Connecticut Department of Environmental Protection.

He lists his current areas of interest as "Insect systematics and biology. Biosystematics of Lepidoptera, especially basal lineages. Conservation biology of invertebrates." He received a Ph.D. from the University of California, Berkeley.

Awards and honors
2006: National Outdoor Book Award (Nature Guidebook), Caterpillars of Eastern North America

Works
Caterpillars of Eastern North America : A Guide to Identification and Natural History. Princeton, NJ : Princeton University Press, 2005.  (cl. : alk. paper)  (pb. : alk. paper)

References

External links
 UConn faculty page

American entomologists
University of Connecticut faculty
University of California, Berkeley alumni
1956 births
Living people